The Government Mental Health Centre at Kuthiravattam near Kozhikode, India is a hospital for the mental patients.  The government provides free treatment and food for the mentally ill patients here.

Recent Developments
Recently the Kerala Government has announced a detailed project report (DPR) for a Rs.20-crore renovation project has been prepared, Minister for Panchayats and Social Justice M.K. Muneer said. "What we are planning is a comprehensive renovation project modelled after the National Institute of Mental Health and Neurosciences (NIMHANS) in Bangalore," Dr. Muneer said.

See also
RaoSahib Dr. Ayyathan Gopalan (First Indian Superintendent and Psychiatrist of Kuthiravattam mental hospital)
 Pottammal
 Govindapuram

References

Hospitals in Kozhikode
Year of establishment missing
Psychiatric hospitals in India